

A habitable exomoon is a moon orbiting an extrasolar planet that has the ideal conditions to host life as we know it. A total of 21 exomoon candidates have been detected, but none of them have been confirmed.

Habitability of extrasolar moons will depend on stellar and planetary illumination on moons as well as the effect of eclipses on their orbit-averaged surface illumination. Other factors such as tidal heating might play a role in a moon's habitability.

Host planet 
Given the general planet-to-satellite mass ratio of 10000, large Saturn or Jupiter-sized gas planets in the habitable zone are believed to be the best candidates to harbor Earth-like moons, with more than 120 such planets discovered by 2018.

Massive exoplanets known to be located within a habitable zone (such as Gliese 876 b, 55 Cancri f, Upsilon Andromedae d, 47 Ursae Majoris b, HD 28185 b and HD 37124 c) are of particular interest as they may potentially possess natural satellites with liquid water on the surface. It was also found that moons at distances between about 5 and 20 planetary radii from a giant planet could be habitable from an illumination and tidal heating point of view.

Habitable edge 
In 2012, scientists introduced a concept to define the habitable orbits of moons. The concept is similar to the circumstellar habitable zone for planets orbiting a star, but for moons orbiting a planet. This inner border, which they call the circumplanetary habitable edge, delimits the region in which a moon can be habitable around its planet. Moons closer to their planet than the habitable edge are uninhabitable.

Magnetosphere 
The magnetic environment of exomoons, which is critically triggered by the intrinsic magnetic field of the host planet, has been identified as another factor of exomoon habitability. Most notably, it was found that moons at distances between about 5 and 20 planetary radii from a giant planet could be habitable from an illumination and tidal heating point of view, but still the planetary magnetosphere would critically influence their habitability.

Tidal-locking 
Earth-sized exoplanets in the habitable zone around red dwarfs are often tidally locked to the host star. This has the effect that one hemisphere always faces the star, while the other remains in darkness. Like an exoplanet, an exomoon can potentially become tidally locked to its primary. However, since the exomoon's primary is an exoplanet, it would continue to rotate relative to its star after becoming tidally locked, and thus would still experience a day-night cycle indefinitely. 

Scientists consider tidal heating as a threat for the habitability of exomoons.

Host star 
There is a minimum mass of roughly 0.20 solar masses for stars to host habitable moons within the stellar habitable zone. When effects of eclipses as well as constraints from a satellite's orbital stability are used to model the runaway greenhouse limit of hypothetical moons, it is estimated that — depending on a moon's orbital eccentricity — there is a minimum mass of roughly 0.20 solar masses for stars to host habitable moons within the stellar habitable zone.

Mass 
If a moon at less than 1% the mass of the Earth such as Europa were to orbit the Sun at a distance similar to Earth's orbit, it would only be able to hold onto its atmosphere for a few million years. However, for any larger, Ganymede-sized moons venturing into its stellar system's habitable zone, an atmosphere and surface water could be retained pretty much indefinitely. Models for moon formation suggest the formation of even more massive moons than Ganymede is common around many of the super-Jovian exoplanets.

Detection 
They are different methods to detect exomoons. Using a transiting exoplanet, the CHEOPS mission could detect exomoons around the brightest red dwarfs. Using the same method, ESPRESSO could detect the Rossiter–McLaughlin effect caused by the exomoons.

Candidates

2MASS J1119-1137AB 
The possible exomoon candidate transiting 2MASS J1119-1137AB lies in the habitable zone of its host (at least initially until the planet cools), but it is unlikely complex life has formed as the system is only 10 Myr old. If confirmed, the exomoon may be similar to primordial earth and characterization of its atmosphere with the James Webb Space Telescope could perhaps place limits on the time scale for the formation of life.

Red dwarf systems 
Scientists studied the possibility of exomoons around planets that orbit red dwarfs in the habitable zone. While they found 33 exoplanets from earlier studies that lie in the habitable zone, only four could host Moon- to Titan-mass exomoons for timescales longer than 0.8 billion years. These four planets were HIP 12961 b, HIP 57050 b, Gliese 876 b and Gliese 876 c. For this mass range however, the exomoons could probably not hold onto their atmosphere.

The researchers increased the mass for the exomoons and found that those with the mass of Mars around Gliese 876 b and c could be stable on timescales above the Hubble time. 

CHEOPS and ESPRESSO could detect exomoons around the four candidates. However, both methods require a transiting exoplanet, which is not the case for HIP 12961 b, HIP 57050 b, Gliese 876 b and Gliese 876 c.

In culture 
 In the fictional universe of Avatar, the Pandoran biosphere is the biosphere of the habitable exomoon Pandora, orbiting the gas giant Polyphemus.

See also 

 Exomoon
 Habitability of natural satellites
 Habitable exoplanet
 List of potentially habitable exoplanets
 Superhabitable planet

References 

Planetary habitability
Exoplanetology
Astrobiology
Exomoons
Types of planet